The 2014 FIFA World Cup qualification UEFA Group I was a UEFA qualifying group for the 2014 FIFA World Cup. The group comprised 2010 FIFA World Cup winners Spain, along with France, Belarus, Georgia and Finland.

Spain won the group and thus qualified directly for the 2014 FIFA World Cup. France ranked among the eight best runners-up and advanced to the play-offs, where they were drawn to play home-and-away matches against Ukraine. After losing the first match by two goals, they won the second by three, thus qualifying for the World Cup.

Standings

Matches
The fixtures were decided at a meeting held in Paris, France, on 23 September 2011.

Goalscorers
There were 44 goals in 20 matches, for an average of 2.20 goals per match.

5 goals

 Franck Ribéry

4 goals

 Pedro

3 goals

 Álvaro Negredo

2 goals

 Teemu Pukki
 Olivier Giroud
 Jordi Alba
 Sergio Ramos

1 goal

 Renan Bressan
 Stanislaw Drahun
 Egor Filipenko
 Timofei Kalachev
 Anton Putsila
 Dmitry Verkhovtsov
 Sergei Kornilenko
 Roman Eremenko
 Kasper Hämäläinen
 Karim Benzema
 Étienne Capoue
 Abou Diaby
 Christophe Jallet
 Samir Nasri
 Paul Pogba
 Mathieu Valbuena
 Guram Kashia
 Alexander Kobakhidze
 Tornike Okriashvili
 Juan Mata
 Roberto Soldado
 Xavi

1 Own goal

 Igor Shitov (playing against Finland)
 Joona Toivio (playing against France)

Discipline

References

External links
Results and schedule for UEFA Group I (FIFA.com version)
Results and schedule for UEFA Group I (UEFA.com version)

I
2012–13 in Spanish football
Qual
2012–13 in French football
qual
2012 in Belarusian football
2013 in Belarusian football
2012 in Finnish football
2013 in Finnish football
2012–13 in Georgian football
2013–14 in Georgian football